Russell Warren (born 10 September 1971) is an English cricket umpire and former first-class cricketer. He was a right-handed batsman, a wicket-keeper and an occasional right-arm offbreak bowler.

As a youth he toured New Zealand with England Young Cricketers in the 1990–91 season, playing two test matches and two one day internationals. He also played two youth ODIs against Australia the following summer, opening the batting with future county colleague Mal Loye.

He made his first team debut for his home-county Northamptonshire in 1992, and played for the county in 109 first-class matches over ten seasons. During this time he made ten centuries, with a highest score of 201 not out, but only reached the landmark of 1000 runs in a season once; in 2001.

Warren left Northamptonshire at the end of the 2002 season. His departure was occasioned by a dressing room split after he began going out with the ex-fiancée of his fellow wicketkeeper Toby Bailey.

Following this, Warren played for Nottinghamshire in the 2003–2006 seasons. Despite scoring five first-class centuries in this period, he was released at the end of the 2006 season.

References

External links
Russell Warren at ECB

1971 births
Living people
English cricketers
English cricket umpires
Northamptonshire cricketers
Nottinghamshire cricketers
Wicket-keepers